PS Briton was a paddle steamer that inaugurated the Stranraer to Larne service.

Service
PS Briton inaugurated the Stranraer to Larne crossing, but the service was not a success and was withdrawn after 18 months, in 1863. Following this, she operated from Bristol to the South of Ireland, to Waterford between 1864–1866 and to Wexford between 1867 and 1890. Her final year was spent under the ownership of the Waterford Steamship Company.

Footnotes

Paddle steamers of the United Kingdom
1862 ships